Dundas is a subway station on Line 1 Yonge–University in Toronto, Ontario, Canada. It is located at the intersection of Yonge Street and Dundas Street. Wi-Fi service is available at this station.

History
The original address, 300 Yonge Street, is still commonly used in TTC system maps.

When Toronto's Eaton Centre was built in the 1970s, a pedestrian tunnel was constructed under the tracks outside the fare-paid areas, connecting the two separate concourses. The station was refurbished in 1982, with the original Vitrolite tiles being replaced with yellow ceramic tiling.

On September 27, 1997, 23-year-old Charlene Minkowski was killed when she was pushed onto the tracks in front of an oncoming train at Dundas by Herbert Cheoung, a diagnosed schizophrenic. Cheoung was given a sentence which included no parole for 15 years.

As part of the construction of Yonge–Dundas Square in the early 2000s, a new entrance staircase was created, giving access to the station directly from the square. In 2002, this station became accessible with the addition of elevators.

Following controversy over the namesake of Dundas Street, Henry Dundas, 1st Viscount Melville, who delayed the abolition of the transatlantic slave trade, Toronto City Council voted in 2021 to rename Dundas Street and other civic assets named after Dundassuch as Dundas station. A new name will be chosen in April 2022.

Station description

The station is located under Yonge Street at Dundas Street and is built on three levels, with entrances on every corner of the intersection. and all being accessible except for the northwest one, which is a sidewalk staircase at the Atrium on Bay. The southeast, southwest, and northeast entrances are located at Yonge Dundas Square, in the Eaton Centre and at 10 Dundas East inside the Cineplex Cinemas building respectively. All elevators that connect the entrance to the station are not provided by the TTC, but by the respective managements.

Dundas is the only station in Toronto where the northbound and southbound platforms are in separate fare-paid areas, owing to the constrained space and difficult geology at this location. Separate street entrances had to be used for each direction until the Eaton Centre was built, at which time a tunnel was constructed under the tracks outside the fare-paid areas, which is considered the third level. If on the wrong platform, passengers (including Presto card holders) can take a transfer from the transfer machines available on the platform, exit the station, and re-enter the station on the other platform by showing the collector at the booth the transfer obtained.

The station has underground connections to the Toronto Eaton Centre, 10 Dundas East and the Atrium on Bay, and is one of five stations connected to PATH.

Architecture and art
The station features William McElcheran's Cross Section, located by the northwest entrance and along the under-platform crosswalk. It depicts a vibrant urban scene of pets, shoppers, businessmen and other commuters. The piece was created out of terra cotta and fired in two-foot-square tiles. The artwork was donated by Atrium on Bay in May 1984.

Subway infrastructure in the vicinity
North of the station, the subway continues to travel through its tunnels underneath Yonge Street, passing over a double crossover, before entering College station. South of the station, it continues underneath Yonge Street, over Lower Queen station, before fully entering Queen station.

Nearby landmarks
Nearby landmarks include Yonge-Dundas Square, the north end of the Eaton Centre, the former Toronto Coach Terminal, Toronto City Hall, the Ed Mirvish Theatre, and 10 Dundas East. Buildings on the campus of Toronto Metropolitan University surround the station to the west, north and east. Nearby public art galleries include the Ryerson Image Centre and Gallery Arcturus.

Surface connections 

A transfer is required to connect between the subway system and these surface routes:

TTC routes serving the station include:

References

External links 

Line 1 Yonge–University stations
PATH (Toronto)
Railway stations in Canada opened in 1954